Gligor Gligorov (born 5 March 1987) is a footballer from North Macedonia who most recently played for FK Kit-Go Pehčevo.

International career
He made his senior debut for Macedonia as a late substitute for Goran Pandev in a November 2009 friendly match against Iran in Teheran.

Statistics

References

External links
 Profile at MacedonianFootball 
 

1987 births
Living people
People from Probištip
Association football defenders
Macedonian footballers
North Macedonia international footballers
FK Sileks players
FC Baník Ostrava players
Tampines Rovers FC players
HŠK Zrinjski Mostar players
FK Bregalnica Štip players
Macedonian First Football League players
Czech First League players
Singapore Premier League players
Premier League of Bosnia and Herzegovina players
Macedonian Second Football League players
Macedonian expatriate footballers
Expatriate footballers in the Czech Republic
Macedonian expatriate sportspeople in the Czech Republic
Expatriate footballers in Singapore
Expatriate footballers in Bosnia and Herzegovina
Macedonian expatriate sportspeople in Bosnia and Herzegovina